Saffiyah Khan is a political activist born on November 27, 1997, English singer and model of Pakistani and Bosnian origins.

She became an icon of passive resistance in 2017 after being photographed facing a member of the English Defense League (EDL), a far-right group, during an anti- Muslim demonstration in Birmingham.

In 2019, she participated in the Encore album of the British ska band The Specials.

Biography 
Saffiyah Khan was born in Great Britain, but is originally of Pakistani and Bosnian origins...

On April 8, 2017, aged 20, she was photographed standing up to Ian Crossland, the leader of the English Defence League (EDL), a far-right group, during an anti-Muslim demonstration organised in Birmingham the day after the Westminster bombings , . Having come to observe the demonstration in order to support the “people they harass and attack”, Saffiyah Khan stepped in to protect a veiled woman, Saira Zafar, taken to task by several demonstrators,.

The photograph, taken by Joe Giddens, of the Press Association agency was relayed by many British media including The Guardian, The Daily Telegraph, The Daily Mirror and the BBC before the story took on an international dimension,,,. It resonates with other shots illustrating recent resistance movements. On May 1 , 2016, Simon Lindberg photographed Tess Asplund facing neo-Nazis in Borlänge, Sweden. Three months later, Jonathan Bachman grabbed Ieshia Evans face-to-face with police during a Black Lives Matter protest in Baton Rouge, Louisiana.

Khan was noticed by members of the Specials because she wore a T-shirt with her likeness on the images shot the day of the demonstration. She was invited by singer Lynval Golding to one of their upcoming   concerts. In 2019, she participated in the album Encore, performing a revisited version of Prince Buster's Ten Commandments of Man .

In the spring of 2017, Khan took her first steps on the catwalk during the fashion show of Turkish designer Dilara Findikoglu. She then engaged with the modeling agency Elite and its Collective division which represents talents rather than professional models

References 

Pakistani political people